Balnageith, located on the western edge of the suburbs of Forres in Moray, Scotland, is the site of an excavated linear cropmark with a rounded corner that has been interpreted as a possible Roman military camp or fort.

Blalnageith was the birthplace of Duncan Dunbar (senior) in the 1760s Dunbar moved to London and became a brewer in Limehouse, London.

Administrative Area:

 Council: Moray
 Parish: Forres

References

Bibliography
 
 

Archaeological sites in Moray